Kome Rural LLG is a local-level government (LLG) of Morobe Province, Papua New Guinea.

Wards
01. Engati
02. Tsewi (Kamasa language and Kawacha language speakers)
03. Umba
04. Engiapa
05. Jipa
06. Menya
07. Yakwe
08. Longwi
09. Ilbale
10. Kwaplalim
11. Helolpa
12. Kenoli
13. Wanagapali
14. Hatingli
15. Ikumdi
16. Menyamya Station

References

Local-level governments of Morobe Province